The 1988 Tokyo Indoor – also known by its sponsored name Seiko Super Tennis – was a men's tennis tournament. Part of the 1988 Nabisco Grand Prix, it took place on from 18 October to 23 October 1988 on indoor carpet courts at the Yoyogi National Gymnasium in Tokyo. It was a major tournament of the Grand Prix tennis circuit and matches were the best of three sets. Second-seeded Boris Becker won the singles title.

Finals

Singles

 Boris Becker defeated  John Fitzgerald 7–6(7–4), 6–4
 It was Becker's 5th singles title of the year and the 17th of his career.

Doubles

 Andrés Gómez /  Slobodan Živojinović defeated  Boris Becker /  Eric Jelen 7–5, 5–7, 6–3

References

External links
 ITF tournament edition details

Tokyo Indoor
Tokyo Indoor
Tokyo Indoor